Unibank, S.A. is one of Haiti's two largest private commercial banks. The bank was founded in 1993 by a group of Haitian investors and is the main company of Groupe Financier National (GFN). It opened its first office in July 1993 in downtown Port-au-Prince and has 51 branches throughout the country as of the end of 2017.

On December 28, 2016, Unibank acquired Scotiabank's Haiti operations. Today, Unibank is the parent company of a group of subsidiaries each concentrating in a specific financial area:
 Unicarte (Credit cards)
 Unifinance (Investment banking)
 Unicrédit (Consumer finance)
 IMSA (Real estate)
 SNI (Investment management)
 Capital Consult (Consulting firm)
 Unitransfer (Money transfer)
 Micro Crédit National (Microcredit)
 UniAssuranes (Insurance)

1993 establishments in Haiti
Banks of Haiti